Intezaar is a Pakistani Urdu-language family drama series, produced by A-Plus. The drama airs weekly on A-Plus Entertainment every Thursday on Prime time. It stars Anum Fayyaz, Mikaal Zulfiqar and Sana Javed in lead roles. Intezaar is a story which revolves around element of tragedy and
romance intertwined together in a beautiful yet complexed manner.

Cast

Mikaal Zulfiqar as Shariq
Sana Javed as Zoya
Anum Fayyaz as Saba
Ismat Iqbal as Zoya's mother
Azfar Rehman as Azmeer
Faiza Gillani as Naila
Sajida Syed as Azmeer's mother
Durdana Butt as Zoya's grandmother
Munazzah Arif as Nafisa
Mehmood Akhtar as Azmeer's father

References

Pakistani television shows